Achnanthidiaceae is a family of diatoms in the order Achnanthales. It contains 461 species within 22 genera.

Genera 
The following genera are accepted within Achnanthidiaceae according to AlgaeBase.

 Achnanthidium
 Astartiella
 Crenotia
 Eucocconeis
 Gliwiczia
 Gogorevia
 Gololobovia
 Gomphothidium
 Haloroundia
 Karayevia
 Kolbesia
 Lemnicola
 Madinithidium
 Majewskaea
 Planothidium
 Platebaikalia
 Platessa
 Psammothidium
 Pseudachnanthidium
 Rossithidium
 Skabitschewskia
 Trifonovia

References 

Achnanthales